Nancy Fraser (born May 20, 1947) is an American philosopher, critical theorist, feminist, and the Henry A. and Louise Loeb Professor of Political and Social Science and professor of philosophy at The New School in New York City.  Widely known for her critique of identity politics and her philosophical work on the concept of justice, Fraser is also a staunch critic of contemporary liberal feminism and its abandonment of social justice issues.  Fraser holds honorary doctoral degrees from four universities in three countries, and won the 2010 Alfred Schutz Prize in Social Philosophy from the American Philosophical Association. She was President of the American Philosophical Association Eastern Division for the 2017-2018 term.

Career
Fraser earned her bachelor's degree in philosophy at Bryn Mawr in 1969, and a PhD in philosophy from the CUNY Graduate Center in 1980.  She taught in the philosophy department at Northwestern University for many years before moving to the New School in 1995. She has been a visiting professor at universities in Germany, France, Spain, and the Netherlands. In addition to her many publications and lectures, Fraser is a former co-editor of Constellations, an international journal of critical and democratic theory, where she remains an active member of the Editorial Council. She has been invited to deliver the Tanner Lectures at Stanford University and the Spinoza Lectures at the University of Amsterdam.

Research
Fraser has written on a wide variety of issues, but she is primarily known for her work on the philosophical conceptions of justice and injustice.  Fraser argues that justice can be understood in two separate but interrelated ways: distributive justice (in terms of a more equitable distribution of resources), and recognition justice (the recognition of difference between social identities and groups). There are two corresponding forms of injustice: maldistribution and misrecognition.

Fraser argues that many social justice movements in the 1960s and 1970s argued for recognition on the basis of race, gender, sexuality, or ethnicity, and that the focus on correcting misrecognition eclipsed the importance of challenging the persistent problems of maldistribution.  In other words, Fraser asserts that too much of a focus on identity politics diverts attention from the deleterious effects of neoliberal capitalism and the growing wealth inequality that characterizes many societies.

In more recent work, Fraser goes even further in linking the narrow focus of identity politics with the widening gap between the rich and poor, particularly with regard to liberal feminism, which Fraser calls the "handmaiden" of capitalism.  Reflecting on Sheryl Sandberg's 2013 book Lean In, Fraser explained:

For me, feminism is not simply a matter of getting a smattering of individual women into positions of power and privilege within existing social hierarchies. It is rather about overcoming those hierarchies. This requires challenging the structural sources of gender domination in capitalist society — above all, the institutionalized separation of two supposedly distinct kinds of activity: on the one hand, so-called "productive" labor, historically associated with men and remunerated by wages; on the other hand, "caring" activities, often historically unpaid and still performed mainly by women. In my view, this gendered, hierarchical division between "production" and "reproduction" is a defining structure of capitalist society and a deep source of the gender asymmetries hard-wired in it. There can be no "emancipation of women" so long as this structure remains intact.

In March 2022, she was amongst 151 international feminists signing Feminist Resistance Against War: A Manifesto, in solidarity with the Feminist Anti-War Resistance initiated by Russian feminists after the Russian invasion of Ukraine.

Books

Fortunes of Feminism
Fortunes of Feminism: From State-Managed Capitalism to Neoliberal Crisis is a collection of essays written from 1985 to 2010 that aims at dissecting the "drama in three acts" that according to the author is the thread of second-wave feminism. Act one represents the moment when the feminist movement joined radical movements to transform society through uncovering gender injustice and capitalism's androcentrism, while act two, Fraser highlights with regret, is a switch from redistribution to recognition and difference and a shift to identity politics that risk to support neoliberalism through efforts to build a free-market society. Foreseeing act three as a revival of the movement, Fraser argues for a reinvigorated feminist radicalism able to address the global economic crisis. Feminism must be a force working in concert with other egalitarian movements in the struggle to bring the economy under democratic control, while building on the visionary potential of the earlier waves of women's liberation.

The work is considered an important contribution as it provides a clear frame to rethink issues related to labor, emancipation, identity, rights claims at the core of political demands of justice in the contemporary context of neoliberalism. Although a necessary incorporation of political economy into contemporary feminist discourse, Fraser's use of theoretical schemas has been criticized as dense and baffling at times—it is unclear, for example, why there are three types of needs discourses, four registers of dependency, or seven principles of gender justice. M. E. Mitchell, writer for Marx & Philosophy, writes "This [complexity] is, perhaps, owing to her propensity to avail herself of whatever terms best encapsulate processes of institutionalized oppression. Thinking thus, from the ground up, gives her work a complexity that at times compromises the systematic quality and coherence of her theoretical categories."

Unruly Practices
Unruly Practices: Power, Discourse, and Gender in Contemporary Social Theory is a collection of essays written between 1980 and 1989. The book examines the theories of power and source in Foucault, the politics of French deconstruction and Richard Rorty, the politics of gender in Habermas, and the politics of need interpretation in two concluding essays which delineate her own position within contemporary socialist-feminist critical theory. Contemporaries such as Douglas Kellner have praised Fraser's writings as "seasoned with social hope" and effectively synthesizing feminist commitment to political agency and social progress with several forms of modern and postmodern social skepticism. However, others have criticized her goal of providing "the sort of big diagnostic picture necessary to orient [the current] political practice" of socialist feminism for being both too ambitious and ultimately too narrow. Patricia S. Mann, for example, summarizes the pitfalls of the text as follows:

I wish Fraser had made more of an effort to call upon the resources of analytic philosophy. It is true that analytic philosophers look all the way back to Immanuel Kant and Jeremy Bentham for their paradigms of analytic philosophy. Unfazed because untouched by these notions of social constitution of individuals, or by the irrationalities of individual thought, philosophy offers an outmoded yet still seaworthy vessel for any seeking to ride out the storms of postmodern disillusionment with notions of agency and process. Had Fraser utilized the works of analytic political thinkers when she finally came to formulate her socialist-feminist theory of the welfare state she could have exploited the admittedly "thin" theories of political agency and political rights within political philosophy today.

Awards and honors
 Doctor Honoris Causa, Erasmus School of History, Culture and Communication and Faculty of Philosophy, Erasmus University Rotterdam, 2014.
 Doctor Honoris Causa, Universidad Nacional de San Martin, Buenos Aires, Argentina, 2014.
 International Research Chair in Social Justice, Collège d'études mondiales, Paris, 2011-2016
 Senior Fellow, Center for Advanced Studies "Justitia Amplificata," Frankfurt, 2013.
 Rosa Luxemburg Foundation Fellow, November–December 2012.
 Einstein Visiting Fellow, JFK Institute for North American Studies, Freie Universität, Berlin, 2010–2012.
 Humanitas Visiting Professor in Women's Rights, University of Cambridge, UK, March 2011
 Doctor Honoris Causa, Roskilde University, Denmark, 2011.
 Donald Gordon Fellow, Stellenbosch Institute for Advanced Studies, South Africa, 2011.
 Alfred Schutz Prize in Social Philosophy, American Philosophical Association, 2010.
 Chaire Blaise Pascal, École des hautes études en sciences sociales, Paris, 2008-2010
 Awarded the Doctor Honoris Causa, by the National University of Cordoba (Argentina), 2006.
 American Academy of Arts and Sciences Fellow,  2019.
 Karl Polanyi Visiting Professorship, 2021.

Bibliography
Books
 
 
 
 
 
 
 
 
 
 

Edited books and select contributions to edited volumes
 
 
 
 
 
 
 
 
 
 

Journal articles

References

Further reading
 
  Pdf. 
  (Review of Fortunes of Feminism: From State-Managed Capitalism to Neoliberal Crisis.)
  Pdf (in Spanish).

External links
  Essay "Rethinking Recognition", New Left Review 3, May–June 2000.
  Essay "On Justice: Lessons from Plato, Rawls and Ishiguro", New Left Review 74, March–April 2012.
 Essay "Transnationalizing the Public Sphere", March 2005.
  "The New School For Social Research"
  Feminism, Capitalism, and the Cunning of History, lecture by Nancy Fraser (video, 55:33 min.), French Sociology Association Congress, Paris, April 17, 2009.
  Interview with Nancy Fraser: Justice as Redistribution, Recognition and Representation, in Barcelona Metropolis, March 2009.
 Interview with Nancy Fraser:  Global Justice and the Renewal of Critical Theory
Critical Governance Conference - Prof Nancy Fraser Interview, University of Warwick, 2011
 A 2019 Theorypleeb interview series focusing on Capitalism: A Conversation in Critical Theory

1947 births
20th-century American non-fiction writers
20th-century American philosophers
20th-century American women writers
20th-century essayists
21st-century American non-fiction writers
21st-century American philosophers
21st-century American women writers
21st-century essayists
American anti-capitalists
American ethicists
American philosophy academics
American political philosophers
American social commentators
American women academics
American women essayists
American women philosophers
Continental philosophers
Critical theorists
Feminist philosophers
Feminist studies scholars
Feminist theorists
Graduate Center, CUNY alumni
Living people
The New School faculty
Northwestern University faculty
People from Baltimore
Presidents of the American Philosophical Association
Social philosophers
American socialist feminists
Philosophers of culture
Philosophers of economics
Philosophers of history
Philosophers of social science
Philosophy writers
Theorists on Western civilization
Writers about activism and social change
Writers about globalization